Cape Cruz,, is a cape that forms the western extremity of the Granma Province in southern Cuba. It extends into the Caribbean sea and marks the eastern border of the Gulf of Guacanayabo.
Cape Cruz is located in the municipality of Niquero and is part of the Desembarco del Granma National Park.

Architecture

Transport
The cape is the endpoint of the Niquero branch of the "Circuito Sur de Oriente" (CSO) highway.

Notes

References

Cruz
Geography of Granma Province